Boulaur is a commune in the Gers department in southwestern France.

Geography

Population

Abbey
Boulaur Abbey, or St Mary's Abbey, Boulaur, is a monastery of Cistercian nuns. It was founded in the 12th century as a priory of the Order of Fontevraud that was abolished during the French Revolution. Cistercian nuns reinstated it at the end of the 19th century but were expelled under the Associations Act of 1901 (the Waldeck-Rousseau Law). Monastic life was definitively restored in 1949. In 2011 the community had about 30 nuns. In 2022 they declared their intention to resettle the Trappist Abbey of Notre-Dame des Neiges.

See also
Communes of the Gers department

References

Further reading

Histoire de l'ordre de Fontevrault, 1100-1908; by the Religious of Sainte-Marie-de-Fontevrault-de-Boulaur (afterwards at Vera in Navarre). 3 vols. Auch, 1911–15

Communes of Gers